Georg Franz-Willing (11 March 1915 – September 2008) was a German revisionist historian. He was a speaker at the Holocaust denying Institute for Historical Review (IHR), where he was also one of the editors of their newsletter and published it.

He also was a referent in the right-wing of the Society for Free Journalism and mostly published in a publishing company in Germany, such as Druffel Verlag, Grabert Verlag, Schütz-Verlag and Nation Europa Verlag or Hohenrain-Verlag.

His early works on the history of the NSDAP were occasionally used from historians with "seriously deficient" studies and research as a source of material, a takeover of his ratings however, is because of his "closeness to radical light" or "an apologetic tendency"<ref>Hellmuth Auerbach: Hitlers politische Lehrjahre und die Münchener Gesellschaft 1919–1923 In: VfZ 1977: "Bei allen Verdiensten um die frühe Hitlerforschung, die sich Franz-Willing und Maser durch ihre Kärrnerarbeit einer ersten Aufhellung der Parteigeschichte anhand der zur Verfügung stehenden Akten u. a. Dokumente erworben haben, sind beide Arbeiten doch noch stark von den nationalsozialistischen Selbstdarstellungen abhängig, der erstere in seiner deutlich apologetischen Tendenz, der letztere durch vielfach unkritische Anlehnung an „Mein Kampf" u. a. Äußerungen Hitlers. Zudem hat die neuere Forschung Maser häufige Unzuverlässigkeit in den Details nachweisen müssen; ..."</</ref> were avoided.

He believed that the Diary of Anne Frank was a forgery, but that "the Jewish declaration of war on Germany" was real.

References

1915 births
2008 deaths
German Holocaust deniers
German male non-fiction writers
20th-century German historians